Dong Ampham National Biodiversity Conservation Area is an extensive protected area which covers a significant part of Attapeu Province and Sekong Province in the southeast corner of Laos on the border with Vietnam. It covers the northeastern part of Attapeu Province and southeastern part of Sekong Province. 

The heavily forested area, covering about 200,000 hectares, forms one of the National Biodiversity Conservation Areas of Laos. It was established on 29 October 1993. it contains "some of the last intact areas of lowland and tropical forests remaining in mainland Southeast Asia." Rivers flowing through the park include Xe Kaman River and Xe Xou River. The wetlands are home to populations of Siamese crocodiles and elephants and large cats are known to inhabit the park. The volcanic Nong Fa Lake lies within it.

See also
Protected areas of Laos

References

National Biodiversity Conservation Areas
Protected areas established in 1993
Geography of Attapeu province
Geography of Sekong province
1993 establishments in Laos